The HAL HT-2 is an Indian two-seat primary trainer designed and built by Hindustan Aeronautics Limited (HAL). The HT-2 was the first company design to enter production in 1953 for the Indian Air Force and Navy, where it replaced the de Havilland Tiger Moth. The HT-2 is a low-wing cantilever monoplane with a fixed tailwheel landing gear. Powered by a 155 hp (116 kW) Cirrus Major III piston engine, the aircraft has enclosed tandem cockpits with dual controls. Apart from military use, the aircraft was also used by Indian flying schools.

Operators

 Ghana Air Force
12 HAL HT-2s were delivered and used between 1959 and 1974.

 Indian Air Force
 Indian Navy

Specifications (HT-2)

See also
 List of Indian aircraft

References

 The Illustrated Encyclopedia of Aircraft (Part Work 1982–1985), 1985, Orbis Publishing, Page 2172

External links

 HT-2 - India's First Powered Aircraft 

1950s Indian military trainer aircraft
HT-2
Single-engined tractor aircraft
Low-wing aircraft
Aircraft first flown in 1951